Jack Ryan Cooley (born April 12, 1991) is an American professional basketball player for Ryukyu Golden Kings of the Japanese B.League. He played college basketball for the University of Notre Dame.

High school career
Cooley was a three-year starter at Glenbrook South High School and averaged 20.7 points and 11.2 rebounds per game during his junior season. He averaged 20.5 points, 13.5 rebounds, and 4.5 blocks per game in his senior season, but missed the second half of the season due to a thumb injury. According to the ESPN recruiting database, Cooley was ranked as the #33 power forward in the class of 2009. On February 5, 2009, Cooley committed to the University of Notre Dame.

College career

Freshman season
As a freshman at Notre Dame, Cooley appeared in twenty games, averaging 1.0 point and 1.8 rebounds per game.

Sophomore season
In his sophomore season, Cooley appeared in all thirty-four games for Notre Dame off the bench. He averaged 3.7 points and 3.1 rebounds per game.

Junior season
Cooley appeared in thirty-three games, making thirty-one starts in his junior season. He averaged 12.5 points and 8.9 rebounds per game, leading Notre Dame in both scoring and rebounding. He also recorded a team-best fifty-two blocks. Following the season, he won the Big East Most Improved Player award and was named to the all-Big East second team.

Senior season
Before his senior season, Cooley was named to the Naismith Award top fifty early-season watch list. He was also a preseason All-Big East first team selection. Cooley finished his senior season averaging career highs in both points and rebounding at 13.1 and 10.1 per game respectively. Additionally, Cooley was named to the All-Big East first team.

Professional career

After going undrafted in the 2013 NBA draft, Cooley joined the Houston Rockets for the Orlando Summer League and the Memphis Grizzlies for the Las Vegas Summer League. On August 16, 2013, he signed with Trabzonspor of Turkey for the 2013–14 season.

In July 2014, Cooley joined the Memphis Grizzlies for the Orlando Summer League and the Cleveland Cavaliers for the Las Vegas Summer League. On August 19, 2014, he signed with the Utah Jazz. However, he was later waived by the Jazz on October 22, 2014. On November 3, 2014, he was acquired by the Idaho Stampede as an affiliate player. On November 18, 2014, he was deactivated by the Stampede after he injured his thumb in the season opening game against the Erie BayHawks on November 14. He was reactivated on January 9, 2015 after recovering from the injury.

On February 24, 2015, Cooley signed a 10-day contract with the Utah Jazz. Following the conclusion of his 10-day contract on March 6, he was not retained by the Jazz and subsequently returned to the Stampede, playing for them that night. He went on to set a new NBA D-League single-game record by grabbing 29 rebounds against the Los Angeles D-Fenders on March 13. He was then called up again by the Jazz, signing another 10-day contract with the team on March 16 and later signed a multi-year deal with the Jazz on March 26. On October 13, he was waived by the Jazz.

On October 17, 2015, Cooley signed with the Cleveland Cavaliers. However, he was waived on October 23 after appearing in two preseason games. On November 16, he was reacquired by the Idaho Stampede. He appeared in six games for Idaho, with his final appearance coming on November 28. On December 4, he received a contract buyout from Idaho and signed for the rest of the season with the Spanish club Unicaja of the Liga ACB and the Euroleague.

On August 5, 2016, Cooley signed with German club MHP Riesen Ludwigsburg for the 2016–17 season.

On July 29, 2017, Cooley was signed to a two-way contract by the Sacramento Kings of the NBA. Under the terms of the deal, for the 2017–18 season, he will split time between the Kings and their G-League affiliate, the Reno Bighorns.

On July 27, 2018, Cooley signed a one-year deal with the Italian club Dinamo Sassari of the LBA. 

In July 2019, Cooley signed with the Ryukyu Golden Kings in Japan. Cooley had 31 points and 21 rebounds against the Niigata Albirex BB on March 15, 2020. He finished ninth in scoring with 18.4 points per game and pulled down a league-best 13.3 rebounds per game.

NBA career statistics

Regular season

|-
| style="text-align:left;"| 
| style="text-align:left;"| Utah 
| 16 || 0 || 5.4 || .409 || – || .429 || 1.6 || .1 || .4 || .2 || 1.7
|-
| align="left" | 
| style="text-align:left;"| Sacramento 
| 7 || 0 || 12.4 || .481 || – || .737 || 4.3 || .9 || .1 || .0 || 5.7
|- class="sortbottom"
| style="text-align:center;" colspan="2" | Career
| 23 || 0 || 7.6 || .449 || – || .575 || 2.4 || .3 || .3 || .1 || 2.9

References

External links

 FIBA profile
NBA D-League profile
Notre Dame Fighting Irish bio

1991 births
Living people
American expatriate basketball people in Germany
American expatriate basketball people in Italy
American expatriate basketball people in Spain
American expatriate basketball people in Turkey
American men's basketball players
Baloncesto Málaga players
Basketball players from Illinois
Dinamo Sassari players
Idaho Stampede players
Lega Basket Serie A players
Liga ACB players
Riesen Ludwigsburg players
Notre Dame Fighting Irish men's basketball players
People from Glenview, Illinois
Power forwards (basketball)
Reno Bighorns players
Ryukyu Golden Kings players
Sacramento Kings players
Sportspeople from Evanston, Illinois
Trabzonspor B.K. players
Undrafted National Basketball Association players
Utah Jazz players